Pontardawe is the name of an electoral ward of Neath Port Talbot county borough, Wales. It is a division of the Pontardawe community and falls within the parliamentary constituency of Neath.

The greater part of the geographical area of the ward is made up of mountainous grassland and open moorland with a scattering of farms. However, the majority of the population is concentrated in the town of Pontardawe in the south of the ward.

In clockwise order the ward is bounded 
to the north by the wards of Glanamman (in Carmarthenshire), Gwaun-Cae-Gurwen, and Cwmllynfell
to the east by the wards of Ystalyfera and Godre'r Graig
to the southeast by the ward of Rhos
to the south by the wards of Alltwen and Trebanos
to the west by the wards of Clydach and Mawr (both in Swansea)

Local council elections
In the 2017 local council elections, the voter turnout was 44%. The results were:

Key demographics
The Welsh language is widely used in the ward. Only 46.6% of residents aged over 3 have no knowledge of Welsh.
There is a high standard of education in the ward. Only 41.6% of residents have no formal qualifications. 17.2% of residents have a higher qualification.
12.5% of the working population are senior managers and officials, 12.1% are in professional trades, and 13.3% are in associate professional and technical jobs.
The top field of employment in Pontardawe is health and social care, with 16% of the population working in this sector.

References

Electoral wards of Neath Port Talbot